Antonio Campos (born August 24, 1983) is an American filmmaker known for the films Afterschool (2008), Simon Killer (2012), Christine (2016), The Devil All the Time (2020) and The Staircase (2022).

Early life 
Campos was born in New York City. His father is the Brazilian journalist Lucas Mendes, while his mother is an American producer, Rose Ganguzza. His maternal grandparents were Italian.

Career
Campos made his feature-length debut on Afterschool, which had its world premiere at the Cannes Film Festival. The film was later acquired by IFC Films. It was released in a limited release on October 2, 2009. Campos then went on to direct Simon Killer. The film stars Brady Corbet and had its world premiere at the Sundance Film Festival. IFC Films acquired distribution rights to the film, and opened in a limited release in April 2013.

Campos's third feature, Christine, which starred Rebecca Hall, had its world premiere at the Sundance Film Festival. The film was acquired by The Orchard, and released in a limited release on October 14, 2016. Campos was attached to direct a prequel to The Omen for 20th Century Fox. Campos directed the pilot episode of The Sinner, starring Jessica Biel and Christopher Abbott, and also served as an executive producer. The pilot was later ordered to series. He also directed episode 8 of Marvel's The Punisher. In 2020, Campos wrote and directed the psychological thriller The Devil All the Time, which was released in September on Netflix.

Apart from being a director and screenwriter, Campos cofounded the production company Borderline Films, which has produced films such as James White, Katie Says Goodbye, and Martha Marcy May Marlene. In October 2022, it was announced that Campos had been hired as showrunner for the untitled The Batman spin-off series set in Arkham Asylum, in addition to serving as director and an executive producer.

Filmography

Film

Television

Short films

References

External links
 

1983 births
Living people
Film directors from New York City
American people of Brazilian descent
American writers of Italian descent
Brazilian people of Italian descent
Brazilian people of American descent
Film producers from New York (state)
American male screenwriters
Screenwriters from New York (state)
American directors
American television directors
American people of Italian descent
Brazilian American
Brazilian directors